Clypeolampas is a genus of sea urchins belonging to the order Clypeasteroida.

Fossil record
This family is known in Cretaceous the fossil record of Spain and Turkey.

Genera
Species within this genus include: 
Clypeolampas lestelli Cotteau 1887
Clypeolampas ovatus Lamarck 1816
Clypeolampas perovalis Arnaud 1877

References 

Clypeasteroida